The Latvian women's national ice hockey team represents Latvia at the International Ice Hockey Federation's IIHF Women's World Championship and is controlled by the Latvian Ice Hockey Federation. In recent years, participation women's hockey has increased in Latvia; the number of registered women's players grew from 74 in 2018 to 223 in 2020.

Tournament record

Olympic Games
Latvia never qualified for an Olympic tournament. The team participated in the 2006 Olympic qualification tournament and in the Olympic pre-qualification tournaments in 2010, 2014, and 2018.

World Championship
Having failed to qualify for Group A of the 1999 World Championship, Latvia debuted in the 1999 Women's World Championship Group B. In the following tournaments, the Latvian team remained at the Group B level, which was renamed Division I in 2003. They were saved from relegation in 2005, further to the extension of the Top Division. Their best performance was realized during the 2007 tournament with a second place of Division I, complemented by an IIHF World Ranking of 11th. However, in 2008 they finished last in Division I and were relegated. They remained in Division II but earned promotion after the 2009 tournament. In 2011, they reached 11th place once again after finishing 3rd in Division I. In 2013, they were relegated to Division IB, but at the following tournament in 2014, they gained promotion on the home ice in Ventspils, Latvia to Division IA. In 2015, they were relegated once again back to Division IB, where they remained for four tournaments, taking home Division IB silver in 2016 and bronze in 2017 and 2018. Their performance in the 2019 Division IB tournament was much weaker than in the previous several tournaments and culminated in a last place finish and relegation to Division IIA. Due to the COVID-19 pandemic, the 2020 and 2021 Division IIA tournaments were cancelled and the placement tables frozen, resulting in Latvia remaining in 22nd place until Division II tournaments can be organized again.

European Championship

Roster
Roster for the 2019 IIHF Women's World Championship Division I B in Beijing, China, during 6–12 April 2019.

Head Coach: Miks Golubovičs    Assistant Coach: Laila Dekmeijere-Trigubova

† Age at time of tournament, 6 April 2019.

References

External links
 (in Latvian)
IIHF profile
National Teams of Ice Hockey

Ice hockey
Women's national ice hockey teams in Europe
Ice hockey teams in Latvia